Blikstorp is a locality situated in Hjo Municipality, Västra Götaland County, Sweden. It had 222 inhabitants in 2010.

References 

Populated places in Västra Götaland County
Populated places in Hjo Municipality